Forest Bathing is the seventh studio album by A Hawk and a Hacksaw. It was released April 13, 2018. Prior to its release, the song "A Broken Road Lined With Poplar Trees" premiered on Under the Radar's website.

Album name and concept
The term forest bathing refers to the Japanese concept of Shinrin-yoku (森林浴), a Japanese form of nature therapy. According to L.M. Dupli-cation, "This is not an urban music. It's rural; songs of the woods and roads where there are no sidewalks or street lamps to light your way. "A Broken Road lined with Poplar Trees" describes just this- the dirt from the summer sun, a melody from home on my tongue. The song "Babayaga" by Trost, is a tribute to the archetypal crone Babayaga, who sticks out her cane just as a child runs by... And "The Washing Bear" is a classic brass romp, connecting Serbian brass with  Southern brothers in Albania and Turkey..."

The band cites the Valle de Oro National Wildlife Refuge in New Mexico as "their forest bath of choice."

Track listing

Personnel
 Jeremy Barnes - composition, Persian santur
 Heather Trost - composition, strings and woodwind
 Cüneyt Sepetçi - clarinet
 Unger Balász - cimbalom
 Sam Johnson - trumpet
 John Dieterich (from Deerhoof)
 Noah Martinez (from local New Mexican band, Lone Piñon)

References

2018 albums
A Hawk and a Hacksaw albums